Leonardo Colella, also known as Nardo (13 September 1930 – 25 November 2010), was a Brazilian professional football player who played as a striker.

1930 births
2010 deaths
Brazilian footballers
Brazilian expatriate footballers
Expatriate footballers in Italy
Sport Club Corinthians Paulista players
Serie A players
Juventus F.C. players
Sociedade Esportiva Palmeiras players
Associação Portuguesa de Desportos players
Association football forwards
Footballers from São Paulo